Bhutan was founded and unified as a country by Ngawang Namgyal, 1st Zhabdrung Rinpoche in the mid–17th century. After his death in 1651, Bhutan nominally followed his recommended "dual system of government". Under the dual system, government control was split between a secular leader, the Druk Desi (aka Deb Raja); and a religious leader, the Je Khenpo.

Both the Druk Desi and Je Khenpo were under the nominal authority of the Zhabdrung Rinpoche, a reincarnation of Ngawang Namgyal. In practice however, the Zhabdrung was often a child under the control of the Druk Desi, and regional penlops often administered their districts in defiance of the power of the Druk Desis until the rise of the unified Wangchuck dynasty in 1907.

Since the rise of the unified Wangchuck family in 1907, the Druk Gyalpo (lit. "Dragon King") have been the head of state of the Kingdom of Bhutan.

Druk Desis (1650–1905)

Below appears the list of Druk Desis throughout the existence of the office. Officeholders were initially appointed by Zhabdrung Ngawang Namgyal, though after his death the Je Khenpo and civil government decided appointments.

Italics indicate coregencies and caretaker governments, which are not traditionally separately numbered.

Kings of Bhutan (1907–present)

The Bhutanese monarchy was established on 17 December 1907, unifying the country under the control of the Wangchuck dynasty, hereditary penlops (governors) of Trongsa district. The king of Bhutan, formally known as the Druk Gyalpo ("Dragon King"), also occupies the office of Druk Desi under the dual system of government. Since the enactment of the Constitution of 2008, the Druk Gyalpo has remained head of state, while the Prime Minister of Bhutan acts as executive and head of government in a parliamentary democracy under a constitutional monarchy.

Timeline

See also
 Dual system of government
 Druk Gyaltsuen
 Constitution of Bhutan
 History of Bhutan

Notes

References

Further reading
 
 
 
 
 

Bhutan history-related lists
 
Bhutan